The Most Glorious Order of Ojaswi Rajanya was an order of knighthood of Nepal. It was given to foreign heads of state, foreign or Nepalese monarchs.

History 
The order was instituted on 14 May 1934 by King Tribhuhvan Bir Bikram Shah Dev. It was the highest order of Nepal until Nepal Pratap Bhaskara was instituted in 1966.

Insignia
The ribbon of the order is light yellow with narrow white edge stripes. It has a badge worn on the chest and a badge on the sash ribbon.

Grades
The Order of Ojaswi Rajanya has one grade: Member. The order consists of the Sovereign (Parama-Ojaswi-Rajanya), Grand Master (Ati-Ojaswi-Rajanya), and ordinary members (Ojaswi-Rajanya). Conferred on members of the Nepalese and foreign royal families and foreign heads of state.

Members
 Charles de Gaulle
 Queen Aishwarya of Nepal
 Akihito
 Ahmad Shah Khan, Crown Prince of Afghanistan
 Princess Beatrix of the Netherlands
 King Charles III
 Queen Elizabeth The Queen Mother
 Queen Elizabeth II
 Frederik, Crown Prince of Denmark
 Henrik, Prince Consort of Denmark
 Hirohito
 Masahito, Prince Hitachi
 Hanako, Princess Hitachi
 Queen Kanti of Nepal
 Queen Ishwari of Nepal
 Ayub Khan
 Empress Kōjun
 Queen Komal of Nepal
 Heinrich Lübke
 Empress Michiko
 Mohammad Reza Pahlavi
 Indra, Crown Princess of Nepal
 Prince Philip, Duke of Edinburgh
 Prince Basundhara of Nepal
 Prince Himalaya of Nepal
 Kaiser Shumsher Jung Bahadur Rana
 Nir Shumsher Jung Bahadur Rana
 Queen Ratna of Nepal
 Princess Sirindhorn of Thailand
 Queen Sofía of Spain
 Josip Broz Tito
 King Jigme Singye Wangchuck of Bhutan
 Princess Soamsawali of Thailand
 Princess Chulabhorn of Thailand

References

External links
 World Medals Index, Nepal: The Most Glorious Order of Rajanya

Ojaswi Rajanya, Order of
Ojaswi Rajanya, Order of
1934 establishments in Nepal